The Argentine presidential election of 1853 was held on 1 November  to choose the first president of the Argentine Confederation for the period 1854-1860. Justo José de Urquiza was elected president by a wide margin.

It was the first presidential election after the unification of the country in 1852, after Justo José de Urquiza defeated Juan Manuel de Rosas at the Battle of Caseros on 3 February 1852. The State of Buenos Aires seceded on 11 September 1852 and did not participate in elections until 1862.

Results

Results by Province

Notes

References
 
 
 
 

1853 elections in South America
1853 elections
1853 in Argentina
1853
Elections in Argentina